Karin Erdmann (born 1948) is a German mathematician specializing in the areas of algebra known as representation theory (especially modular representation theory) and homological algebra (especially Hochschild cohomology).  She is notable for her work in modular representation theory which has been cited over 1500 times according to the Mathematical Reviews. Her nephew Martin Erdmann is professor for experimental particle physics at the RWTH Aachen University.

Education

She attended the Justus-Liebig-Universität Gießen and wrote her Ph.D. thesis on "2-Hauptblöcke von Gruppen mit Dieder-Gruppen als 2-Sylow-Gruppen" (Principal 2-blocks of groups with dihedral Sylow 2-subgroups) in 1976 under the direction of Gerhard O. Michler.

Professional career
Erdmann was a Fellow of Somerville College, Oxford. Erdmann is a university lecturer emeritus at the Mathematical Institute at the University of Oxford where she has had 25 doctoral students and 45 descendants.  She has published over 115 papers and her work has been cited over 2000 times. She has contributed to the understanding of the representation theory of the symmetric group.

Honors
Erdmann was the inaugural Emmy Noether Lecturer of the German Mathematical Society in 2008.

Selected bibliography

References

External links
 Mathematical Reviews author profile
 Home page at Oxford

Living people
1948 births
20th-century German mathematicians
Women mathematicians
Fellows of Somerville College, Oxford
University of Giessen alumni
Algebraists
21st-century German mathematicians